'State Elementary School Cipinang Melayu 12 Petang is an Indonesian public school in jalan Kartika Eka Paksi, RT.010 RW 06, KPAD Jatiwaringin, Kelurahan Cipinang Melayu, Kecamatan Makasar, Jakarta Timur, Jakarta, Indonesia.

History 
This school is sharing the same main gate into the area.

Another school within the area are: 
 State Elementary School Cipinang Melayu 03 Pagi
 State Elementary School Cipinang Melayu 11 Petang
 State Elementary School Cipinang Melayu 04 Pagi and
 SMAN 81 Jakarta

External links

References

Schools in Jakarta